Shadial is a village of Abbottabad District in Khyber Pakhtunkhwa province of Pakistan. It is located at 34°8'0N 73°7'0E with an altitude of 1093 metres (3589 feet).

References

Populated places in Abbottabad District